Juan Carlos Real Ruiz (born 15 March 1991), known as Juan Carlos, is a Spanish professional footballer who plays as an attacking midfielder for SD Huesca.

Club career
Born in A Coruña, Juan Carlos was a product of local Deportivo de La Coruña's youth system, and made his official debut with the first team on 7 September 2011, playing the full 90 minutes in a 5–1 home win against Girona FC in the second round of the Copa del Rey. He scored 15 goals for the reserves in 2011–12 in the Tercera División.

On 3 June 2012, as Depor were already promoted to La Liga as champions, Juan Carlos made his league debut with the main squad, playing 28 minutes in a 1–0 Segunda División away victory over Villarreal CF B. He continued to appear regularly with the B side, however.

On 14 January 2013, Juan Carlos was loaned to SD Huesca until June. He scored his first professional goal later that month, opening the 2–1 away defeat of CD Numancia but seeing the Aragonese club eventually suffer second-tier relegation.

Juan Carlos returned to the Galicians in July, being definitely promoted to the first team also in division two. He played 27 matches and scored three goals during the season, as Deportivo returned to the top flight at the first attempt.

On 2 April 2014, Juan Carlos was slapped by teammate Luisinho in the face after both argued during a training. On 26 January of the following year, after being rarely used during the campaign, he terminated his contract with Depor and joined second-division side CD Tenerife hours later.

After a two-year spell in the Romanian Liga I with CFR Cluj, Juan Carlos returned to Tenerife after signing a two-year deal. On 27 July 2018, he moved to UD Almería also of the second tier after agreeing to a one-year contract.

On 31 July 2019, free agent Juan Carlos joined his former club Huesca on a two-year deal after their top-flight relegation. On 23 August 2021, after nearly two months without a contract, he re-signed for two years.

Honours
Deportivo
Segunda División: 2011–12

CFR Cluj
Cupa României: 2015–16

Huesca
Segunda División: 2019–20

References

External links

1991 births
Living people
Spanish footballers
Footballers from A Coruña
Association football midfielders
La Liga players
Segunda División players
Segunda División B players
Tercera División players
Deportivo Fabril players
Deportivo de La Coruña players
SD Huesca footballers
CD Tenerife players
UD Almería players
Liga I players
CFR Cluj players
Spanish expatriate footballers
Expatriate footballers in Romania
Spanish expatriate sportspeople in Romania